The Gulf of San Esteban is an embayment in Aysén Region in the Chilean part of Patagonia. The gulf forms a northeastern subembayment of the larger Gulf of Penas and to the northwest it bounds the Bay of San Quintín. The Gulf of San Esteban lies southwest of Forelius Peninsula (part of the larger Taitao Peninsula), southwest of Isthmus of Ofqui and north of San Javier Island.

San Esteban
San Esteban
San Esteban
Taitao Peninsula